The Promenade at Sagemore is a large regional shopping mall located in the Marlton section of Evesham Township, in Burlington County, New Jersey, United States, leased by MSC. Opened in 2001, The Promenade is an open-air lifestyle center with high-end stores and a selection of casual and sit-down dining alternatives. The mall offers 1,242 parking spots and is anchored by L. L. Bean. The mall has a gross leasable area of 272,000 ft².

The Promenade at Sagemore has nearly one mile of frontage on Route 73 in Evesham Township at about a mile south of Route 70. The mall is 3½ miles south of the New Jersey Turnpike via Route 73 and 3¾ miles from Interstate 295. The mall is also accessible from County Route 544 (Marlton Parkway) and Brick Road.

References

External links
The Promenade at Sagemore
MSC: The Promenade at Sagemore
Development at The Promenade at Sagemore

Buildings and structures in Burlington County, New Jersey
Evesham Township, New Jersey
Shopping malls established in 2001
Shopping malls in New Jersey
Tourist attractions in Burlington County, New Jersey